Heinrich Friedrich Füger (8 December 1751, in Heilbronn – 5 November 1818, in Vienna) was a German classicist portrait and historical painter.

Biography
Füger was a pupil of Nicolas Guibal in Stuttgart and of Adam Friedrich Oeser in Leipzig.  Afterward, he traveled and spent some time in Rome and Naples, where he painted frescoes in the Palazzo Caserta.  On his return to Vienna he was appointed court painter, professor, and vice-director of the Academy, and in 1806 director of the Belvedere Gallery.

Among his historical paintings are: The Farewell of Coriolanus (Czernin Gallery, Vienna), Allegory on the Peace of Vienna (1801), The Death of Germanicus (1789), The Assassination of Caesar, and Bathsheba (Budapest Gallery). Among his portraits are those of the Emperor Joseph II, the Grand Duchess Elizabeth Wilhelmine of Württemberg, Queen Caroline of Naples, and Horatio Nelson, who sat for him in Vienna in 1800 (National Portrait Gallery, London).  He painted in the classic style of Louis David and Anton Raphael Mengs and was inclined to be theatrical.

Füger was also a teacher; among his pupils was Gustav Philipp Zwinger, and Franciszek Ksawery Lampi.

Selected paintings

See also
 List of German painters

References

External link

Attribution:

18th-century German painters
18th-century German male artists
German male painters
19th-century German painters
19th-century German male artists
1751 births
1818 deaths
People from Heilbronn
Academic staff of the Academy of Fine Arts Vienna